Witold Lutosławski: String Quartet is a studio album by the Kronos Quartet, containing String quartet by Polish Witold Lutosławski composed in 1964 and first performed in 1965. This string quartet is an example of aleatory music, that is, music in which some element of the composition is left to chance, and/or some primary element of a composed work's realization is left to the determination of its performer(s). As Gerald Gold noted in a review of the Kronos album in The New York Times, "the Lutoslawski composition integrates notated music with chance performance."

Track listing

Credits

Musicians
David Harrington – violin
John Sherba – violin
Hank Dutt – viola
Joan Jeanrenaud – cello

Production
Recorded at Skywalker Sound, Nicasio, California
Judith Sherman, Juhani Liimatainen, and Tony Eckert – engineers

See also
List of 1993 albums

References

1993 classical albums
Kronos Quartet albums
Nonesuch Records albums